Georgiana xanthomelaena is a species of beetle in the family Cerambycidae, the only species in the genus Georgiana.

References

Trachyderini
Monotypic Cerambycidae genera